Sligo–North Leitrim was a parliamentary constituency represented in Dáil Éireann, the lower house of the Irish parliament or Oireachtas, from 2007 to 2016. The constituency elected 3 deputies (Teachtaí Dála, commonly known as TDs). The method of election was proportional representation by means of the single transferable vote (PR-STV).

History and boundaries
The constituency was created by the Electoral (Amendment) Act 2005, which gave effect to the 2004 Constituency Commission Report on Dáil Constituencies and was first used at the 2007 general election. It largely replaced the previous constituency of Sligo–Leitrim, although it ceded the southern half of Leitrim to the new constituency of Roscommon–South Leitrim, though a subsequent revision in 2007 restored a portion of South Leitrim to the constituency. It consisted of all of County Sligo and the parts of County Leitrim, contained in the Local Electoral Areas of Dromahair and Manorhamilton.

The Electoral (Amendment) Act 2009 defined the constituency as:

It was abolished at the 2016 general election and replaced by the re-created Sligo–Leitrim constituency.

TDs

Elections

2011 general election

2007 general election

See also
Dáil constituencies
Politics of the Republic of Ireland
Historic Dáil constituencies
Elections in the Republic of Ireland

References

External links
Oireachtas Members Database

Dáil constituencies in the Republic of Ireland (historic)
Historic constituencies in County Sligo
Historic constituencies in County Leitrim
2007 establishments in Ireland
Constituencies established in 2007
2016 disestablishments in Ireland
Constituencies disestablished in 2016